"Le Régiment de Sambre et Meuse" is a French poem by Paul Cézano set to music by Robert Planquette and arranged and expanded into a military march by .

Background
Cezano penned the lyrics to "Le Régiment de Sambre et Meuse" following the French defeat in the Franco-Prussian War, Planquette setting them to music shortly thereafter. Cezano was one of a number of French artists of the period who sought to reconcile the defeat of France with memories of its historic victories, with the song describing the achievement of human immortality through heroic death.

It was first publicly performed by the baritone Lucien Fugère in a Paris cabaret on March 3, 1870. Quickly finding favor as a popular song, it became a part of the music curriculum in schools during the French Third Republic, and was used at other important moments in French history during the late 19th and early 20th centuries. It was performed to accompany Alfred Dreyfus' degradation ceremony of 1895 and, during the First World War, to accompany the execution of traitors, though it later fell out of favor.

In 1879, a French army chef de musique Rauski changed Cézano's original melody into a pas redoublé and made significant additions.  This march became internationally popular in the late 19th and early 20th centuries and Rauski was widely assumed to have been the original composer.  In the United States, the march is sometimes called the "French National Defilé March" and misattributed to French composer Arthur Turlet (who had composed a piano and orchestra arrangement of the piece).

Use outside France
Since 1936, the Ohio State University Marching Band in the United States has performed "Le Régiment de Sambre et Meuse" as part of its pregame show during the script Ohio formation. It is also a staple of the repertoire of the West Point Band, where it is known by the name "French National Defilé".

"Le Régiment de Sambre et Meuse" is often used for marches of the Belgian military schools in Brussels (KMS) and Sint-Truiden (KSOO) because of the historic link of this song with Belgium. In the most southern part of the Netherlands, the march is played often because of the historic link of this region with Belgium.

"Le Régiment de Sambre et Meuse" is also used for the marchpast piece of the 1st Infantry Regiment Grenadiers Platoon of Chilean Army and the Air Force Academy of Bolivia.  It is used as a marching song during the training of cadets and aspiring officers of the Brazilian Military Police in some states. The march is also used in the Mexican Naval Academy (Heroica Escuela Naval Militar) for drill instructions and parades on special visits. It was the regimental march of the Royal 22nd Regiment of the Canadian Army until 1939.

Use in fiction
In Robert Heinlein's Starship Troopers, the character Sergeant Zim leads his soldiers in the singing of "oldies ... like Le Régiment de Sambre et Meuse and Caissons".

Lyrics

Notes

References

External links
 Complete lyrics
 Modern interpretations:  vocal
 Le Régiment de Sambre et Meuse (The Sambre and Meuse Regiment) on the site of the Fédération Nationale des Combattants Volontaires

Le régiment de la musique de l'air "Sambre et Meuse"
 Mexican Armed Forces interpreting the march in a military parade at the welcome ceremony for the French President François Hollande:  and for the Colombian President Juan Manuel Santos:  and for the King and Queen of Spain: 

1870 compositions
French military marches